The Butler Blackhawk and the Skyway from which it was developed were American three-seat open-cockpit single engine biplanes of the late 1920s that were built in small numbers immediately prior to having their intended production run interrupted by the onset of the Great Depression.

Design and development

The fuselage was built from chromium-molybdenum alloy steel tubing faired to shape with light wooden battens and covered in doped aircraft linen. Separate cockpits were provided for the pilot, in the rear, with the two passengers up front, with a baggage compartment behind the pilot. Unusually, the pilot was provided with dual engine controls, one on each side of the cockpit. Like the fuselage, the empennage was built up from welded chromium-molybdenum alloy steel and covered in fabric with the elevators being adjustable in flight from the cockpit.
The biplane wings were built up around two solid spruce spars with built-up plywood ribs forming the airfoil section. No center section was used, as the wing panels were joined along the centerline. While the main fuel tank was in the fuselage, it was supplemented with smaller gravity tanks in each upper wing root. Frise-type ailerons actuated by push-pull tubes were fitted to the lower wings only.
It was fitted with a split-axle undercarriage.

Variants
All variants were powered by a single  Wright J-5 Whirlwind air-cooled radial engine, although the prototype was initially reported as having a  J-5.
Skyway (ATC 2-49)Prototype, two built, one (msn 101) destroyed before being licensed and one (msn 100, NX7857) converted to Blackhawk standard.
CoachCabin variant, one built (msn 102, NX146E).
Blackhawk (ATC 135)Main variant, 11 built, including one converted from Skyway.
Leuthart DSingle Blackhawk (msn 112, NC14422) renamed by purchaser.

Operational history

Butler Manufacturing were producers of pre-fabricated steel buildings, including aircraft hangars who decided to expand into aircraft construction, however shortly after they begin production, the 1929 Stock Market Crash and the onset of the Great Depression began to severe impacted their profitability, both with their main line of business, and with regards to aviation and they almost immediately shut down their production line to preserve their core business. As a result, only 13 serial numbers were allocated.

Art Goebel, known as the winner of the disastrous Dole Air Race in which many of the entrants failed to survive, and for the aerobatic routines he carried out in a Waco ATO, made a test flight from Kansas City, Missouri to San Antonio, Texas in a Blackhawk, and liked it enough to buy one for his personal use.

Hoot Gibson, a famous 1920s and 1930s cowboy actor, bought Blackhawk NC730K serial 105, however, it was while flying a similar Swallow biplane borrowed from a friend that he crashed at the National Air Races in Los Angeles on 3 July 1933, and not the Blackhawk.

Some examples began being used as crop dusters at the end of the 1930s.

Operators

National Airlines operated NC599H (msn 106) briefly, and mainly as a trainer.

Compañía Aeronáutica del Sur operated the first prototype (msn 100) as X-BAHH.

Surviving aircraft
msn 110 N593H is currently registered and airworthy by a private owner with the FAA in Rockton, Illinois, and as last seen was painted black with yellow wings at the Kelch Aviation Museum in Brodhead, Wisconsin.
msn 111 NX299N is currently on display at the Science City at Union Station, suspended over the atrium and painted orange with cream wings and control surfaces.

Specifications (Butler Blackhawk ( 135) )

See also

1928 in aviation

Aircraft of comparable role, configuration and era 
Brunner-Winkle Bird
Command-Aire 3C3
Parks P-1
Pheasant H-10
Waco ASO

Related lists 
List of civil aircraft

References

Notes

Citations

Bibliography

External links
Blackhawk msn 110 N593H having engine run up

Butler aircraft
1920s United States civil aircraft
Agricultural aircraft
Aircraft first flown in 1928
Biplanes
Civil utility aircraft
Single-engined tractor aircraft
United States civil aircraft